The Old Swimmin' Hole may refer to:

The Old Swimmin Hole - 1883 poem by James Whitcomb Riley on which the films were based
The Old Swimmin' Hole (1921 film), an American comedy film directed by Joseph De Grasse
The Old Swimmin' Hole (1940 film), an American drama film directed by Robert F. McGowan